Chromodomain-helicase-DNA-binding protein 7 also known as ATP-dependent helicase CHD7 is an enzyme that in humans is encoded by the CHD7 gene.

CHD7 is an ATP-dependent chromatin remodeler homologous to the Drosophila trithorax-group protein Kismet. Mutations in CHD7 are associated with CHARGE syndrome. This protein belongs to a larger group of ATP-dependent chromatin remodeling complexes, the CHD subfamily.

Model organisms

Model organisms have been used in the study of CHD7 function. A conditional knockout mouse line, called Chd7tm2a(EUCOMM)Wtsi was generated as part of the International Knockout Mouse Consortium program — a high-throughput mutagenesis project to generate and distribute animal models of disease to interested scientists.

Male and female animals underwent a standardized phenotypic screen to determine the effects of deletion. Twenty four tests were carried out on mutant mice and five significant abnormalities were observed.  No homozygous mutant embryos were identified during gestation, and therefore none survived until weaning. The remaining tests were carried out on heterozygous mutant adult mice. Male heterozygotes displayed abnormal pelvic elevation in a modified SHIRPA test and have a high incidence of Bergmeister's papilla in both eyes.  When the brains of heterozygous animals were studied, an absence of corpus callosum was observed.

Clinical

Mutations in this gene have been associated with the CHARGE syndrome.

References

Further reading 

 
 
 
 
 
 
 
 
 
 
 
 
 
 
 
 
 
 
 
 
  In 
  In 
  In

External links 
 
 

Genes mutated in mice